The 2022 FIS Ski Jumping Grand Prix was the 29th Summer Grand Prix season in ski jumping for men and the 11th for women.

For the first time since this season (both in summer and winter), the “Super Team” is taking place – a duo competition. It will consist of three competitions in which each nation can enter only one team. All submitted duos will take part in the first round, twelve teams will advance to the second round, and the eight best teams after two series will be shown in the final.

Map of Grand Prix hosts 
All 5 locations hosting world cup events for men (5), for women (4) and shared (4) in this season.

 Shared (Men and Women)
 Men Only

Men 
Grand Prix history in real time

after LH event in Klingenthal (2 October 2022)

Calendar

Men's team 
World Cup history in real time

after NH event in Râșnov (17 September 2022)

Standings

Overall

Nations Cup

Prize money

Women 
World Cup history in real time

after LH event in Klingenthal (2 October 2022)

Calendar

Standings

Overall

Nations Cup

Prize money

Mixed team 
World Cup history in real time

after LH event in Klingenthal (1 October 2022)

Podium table by nation 
Table showing the Grand Prix podium places (gold–1st place, silver–2nd place, bronze–3rd place) by the countries represented by the athletes.

Points distribution 
The table shows the number of points won in the 2022 FIS Ski Jumping Grand Prix for men and women.

See also
2022–23 FIS Ski Jumping World Cup
2022–23 FIS Ski Jumping Continental Cup
2022–23 FIS Cup (ski jumping)

Notes

References 

Grand Prix
FIS Grand Prix Ski Jumping